Wian Conradie (born 14 October 1994) is a Namibian rugby union player who plays for the New England Free Jacks of Major League Rugby (MLR). Conradie previously played for Gloucester in the Premiership Rugby He was named to Namibia's squad for the 2015 Rugby World Cup.

On 15 July 2021, Conradie went to England to play for Gloucester in the Premiership Rugby in the 2021-22 season. In March 2022, Conradie returned to the Free Jacks.

References

1994 births
Living people
Namibian rugby union players
Namibia international rugby union players
Place of birth missing (living people)
Rugby union flankers
University of Johannesburg alumni
People educated at Windhoek High School
Rugby union number eights
Welwitschias players
Doncaster Knights players
New England Free Jacks players
Gloucester Rugby players